Francesco Barbieri (1623–1698), also known as , was an Italian painter of the Baroque period. He died in Verona. He trained with Antonio Gandini and Pietro Ricchi. He painted historical and landscape canvases.

References

1623 births
1698 deaths
Italian Baroque painters
17th-century Italian painters
Italian male painters
Painters from Verona